Quenten Geordie Felix Martinus (born 7 March 1991) is a Curaçaoan footballer who plays as a left wing for J1 League club Kyoto Sanga FC and the Curaçao national team.

He has also played for SC Heerenveen, FC Botoșani, Yokohama F. Marinos and Urawa Red Diamonds.

Career
He scored his first national goal for Curaçao against U.S. Virgin Islands in the Concacaf Nations League.

Career statistics
.

International goals
Scores and results list Curaçao's goal tally first.

Honours
Ferencváros
Hungarian League Cup: 2013

Urawa Red Diamonds
Emperor's Cup: 2018

References

External links
 

 Voetbal International profile 
 Profile at Yokohama F. Marinos 
Profile at Urawa Red Diamonds

1991 births
Living people
People from Willemstad
Curaçao footballers
Dutch footballers
Dutch people of Curaçao descent
Naturalised citizens of the Netherlands
SC Heerenveen players
Sparta Rotterdam players
FC Emmen players
Ferencvárosi TC footballers
FC Botoșani players
Yokohama F. Marinos players
Urawa Red Diamonds players
Vegalta Sendai players
Montedio Yamagata players
Kyoto Sanga FC players
Eredivisie players
Eerste Divisie players
Nemzeti Bajnokság I players
Liga I players
J1 League players
J2 League players
Curaçao expatriate footballers
Dutch expatriate footballers
Curaçaon expatriates in Romania
Dutch expatriate sportspeople in Romania
Expatriate footballers in Romania
Expatriate footballers in Japan
2014 Caribbean Cup players
2017 CONCACAF Gold Cup players
Curaçao international footballers
Association football wingers